The following pages lists the power stations in Australia by region and status:
 List of power stations in New South Wales
 List of power stations in Queensland
 List of power stations in South Australia
 List of power stations in Tasmania
 List of power stations in Victoria
 List of power stations in Western Australia
 List of proposed power stations in Australia
 List of coal fired power stations in Australia
 List of natural gas fired power stations in Australia
 List of wind farms in Australia
Loy Yang in Victoria is the largest power station in Australia by capacity (consisting of Loy Yang A and Loy Yang B counted together). However, if Loy Yang A and B are counted as separate power stations, Eraring Power Station in New South Wales is Australia's largest.

See also 

Coal mining in Australia
Energy policy of Australia
National Electricity Market
List of largest power stations in the world
Solar power in Australia
Wind power in Australia
List of proposed power stations in Australia